Lukes is a surname. Notable people with the surname include:
 František Lukeš, Czech ice hockey player
 Jaroslav Lukeš, Czech skier
 Konstantina Lukes, American state politician
 Martin Lukeš (born 1978), Czech footballer 
 Radek Lukeš (born 1979), Czech ice hockey goaltender
 Steven Lukes (born 1941), English academic
 William F. Lukes (1847–1923), United States Navy sailor, recipient of the Medal of Honor

Fictional
 Martin Lukes, fictional character featured in Financial Times column